The 2018 Colorado gubernatorial election took place on November 6, 2018, to elect the next and the 43rd Governor of Colorado.  Incumbent Democratic Governor John Hickenlooper was term-limited and could not seek reelection to a third consecutive term. The primary election was held on June 26.

The major party nominees were U.S. Congressman Jared Polis for the Democratic Party and State Treasurer Walker Stapleton for the Republican Party. The general election took place on November 6, 2018, with Polis winning by 268,000 votes. This was the first Colorado gubernatorial election in which both major party candidates received over one million votes.

Polis's victory marked the fourth straight election in which Colorado elected a Democratic governor and the first time in American electoral history that an openly gay politician was elected governor of a state.

Democratic primary
With Hickenlooper ineligible to run for a third term in office, multiple Democratic politicians vied for the party's nomination for Governor. Prior to his resignation in 2015, former Lieutenant Governor Joseph Garcia was seen as a probable candidate for Governor in 2018.

Candidates

Nominated
 Jared Polis, U.S. Representative

Eliminated in the primary
 Mike Johnston, former State Senator
 Cary Kennedy, former Colorado State Treasurer and former CFO and Deputy Mayor of Denver
 Donna Lynne, Lieutenant Governor of Colorado

Eliminated at the convention
 Erik Underwood, former congressional aide, Republican candidate for GA-10 in 2007 and Republican candidate for the U.S. Senate in 2016

Withdrawn
 Ed Perlmutter, U.S. Representative (running for reelection)
 Noel Ginsburg, businessman

Declined
 Joseph Garcia, former Lieutenant Governor
Steve Lebsock, State Representative (was running for State Treasurer before switching to the Republican Party, thus disqualifying him from the Democratic Primary)
 Michael Merrifield, State Senator
 Joe Neguse, former executive director of the Colorado Department of Regulatory Agencies and nominee for secretary of state in 2014 (running for CO-02)
 Joe Salazar, State Representative (running for Attorney General)
 Ken Salazar, former U.S. Senator and former United States Secretary of the Interior

Caucus results
On March 6, 2018, Democrats of precincts across Colorado met and voted how many Delegates each candidate that was caucusing on the ballot would get. As of March 11, 2018 at 7:30 p.m. 96.83% of precincts reported and added up below results.

 Cary Kennedy (11,700; 49.2%)
 Jared Polis (7,784; 32.7%)
Mike Johnston (2,086; 8.8%)
Noel Ginsburg (433; 1.8%), dropped out of race
 Erik Underwood (100; 0.4%)
 Uncommitted (1,668; 7%)

Endorsements

Polling

Results

Republican primary

Candidates

Nominated
 Walker Stapleton, Colorado State Treasurer

Eliminated in the primary
 Greg Lopez, former Mayor of Parker
 Victor Mitchell, former State Representative
 Doug Robinson, businessman

Eliminated at the convention
 Steve Barlock, Trump Co-chair & Coalitions, Colorado Republican National Alternate Delegate and Elector
 Cynthia Coffman, Colorado Attorney General
 Barry Farah, businessman
 Lew Gaiter, Larimer County Commissioner

Withdrawn
 George Brauchler, District Attorney for Colorado's 18th Judicial District (running for Attorney General)
 JoAnne Silva, retired banker
 Tom Tancredo, former U.S. Representative, candidate for Governor in 2014, Constitution Party nominee for Governor in 2010, and candidate for President of the United States in 2008
 Jim Rundberg, businessman

Declined
 John Elway, general manager of the Denver Broncos and retired NFL player
 Owen Hill, state senator and candidate for the U.S. Senate in 2014 (running for CO-05)
 Steve House, Chairman of the Colorado Republican Party and candidate for governor in 2014
 Kent Thiry, Chairman & CEO of DaVita Inc.
 Brian Watson, businessman and candidate for the State House in 2012 (running for State Treasurer)

Caucus results
Based on information shared by some key counties, as well as a recent survey the following are believed to be results of the Republican Caucus from Key Counties.

Pueblo County
 Steve Barlock – 3.14%
 Cynthia Coffman – 7.55%
 Greg Lopez – 16.35%
 Victor Mitchell – 23.90%
 Doug Robinson – 3.15%
 Walker Stapleton – 45.91%

Douglas County
 Steve Barlock – 32.5%
 Cynthia Coffman – 4.6%
 Lew Gaiter III – 2.2%
 Greg Lopez – 18.8%
 Victor Mitchell – 7.7%
 Doug Robinson – 2.2%
 Walker Stapleton – 23.2%
 Tom Tancredo (dropped out of the race) – 1.6%
 Uncommitted – 7.2%

Endorsements

Polling

Results

Third party and independent candidates

Candidates

Declared
 Paul Noel Fiorino (Independent), perennial candidate
 Scott Helker (Libertarian)
 Bill Hammons (Unity Party of America), insurance agent, chairman and founder of the Unity Party of America, and candidate for the U.S. Senate in 2014 and 2016
 Marcus Giavanni (Independent), radio host

General election

Debates

Predictions

Endorsements

Polling

with Cary Kennedy

with Tom Tancredo

Results

References

External links
Candidates at Vote Smart
Candidates at Ballotpedia

Official campaign websites
Paul Fiorino (U) for Governor
Marcus Giavanni (I) for Governor
Bill Hammons (U) for Governor
Scott Helker (L) for Governor
Jared Polis (D) for Governor
Walker Stapleton (R) for Governor

Gubernatorial
2018
2018 United States gubernatorial elections